Robert Walter Speer (December 1, 1855 – May 14, 1918) was elected mayor of Denver, Colorado three times. He served two four-year terms in office from 1904 to 1912. He died from Influenza, early on in the worldwide epidemic of that year on May 14, 1918, while halfway through a third term in office that had started in 1916.

Biography
Speer was born in Mount Union, Pennsylvania, on December 1, 1855.  He married Kate Thrush, his childhood sweetheart, in 1882.

As an adherent of the City Beautiful movement, Speer initiated several projects that added new landmarks, updated existing facilities, and signed Speer Amendment for non-political administration, and dropped his Democrat affiliation in 1916 When elected to third term; improved the city's landscape including:
 City Auditorium, site of the 1908 Democratic National Convention
 The Civic Center
 Denver Mountain Parks
 The Denver Zoo expansion from 1906 to 1918.
 Denver Museum of Nature and Science
 The paving and graveling of many of the city's remaining dirt streets
 An urban forestry program that eventually distributed 110,000 free shade trees to city residents

Speer was the first mayor of Denver to die while serving in office. Speer Boulevard in Denver is named in his honor. He is buried in Fairmount Cemetery in Denver.

References

Bibliography

External links

1855 births
1918 deaths
Deaths from Spanish flu
Mayors of Denver
19th-century American politicians